Mathew Kojo Kum (born 31 August 1945) is a Ghanaian politician and a member of the first Parliament of the fourth Republic representing the Tarkwa-Nsuaem constituency in the Western region of Ghana. He represented the National Democratic Congress.

Early life and education 
Kum was born on 31 August 1945 at Tarkwa-Nsuaem in the Western Region of Ghana. He attended the Advance Teacher Training College and obtained his Teachers' Training Certificate in Geography.

Politics 
Kum was first elected into Parliament on the ticket of the National Democratic Congress for the Tarkwa-Nsuaem Constituency in the Western Region of Ghana during the 1992 Ghanaian General Elections. He was defeated by Joseph Ghansah of the convention People's Party.

Career 
Kum is an administrative manager by profession and a former member of Parliament for the Tarkwa-Nsuaem Constituency in the Western Region of Ghana.

Personal life 
Kum is a Christian.

References 

Living people
1945 births
National Democratic Congress (Ghana) politicians
Ghanaian MPs 1993–1997
People from Western Region (Ghana)
Ghanaian Christians